Manwath Road railway station is a main railway station in Parbhani district, Marathwada region of the Maharashtra. Its code is MVO. It serves Manwath village. It is administered by  the Nanded Division of South Central Railway. The station consists of two platforms. The platforms are not well sheltered. It lacks many facilities including water and sanitation.

The station lines on  Kacheguda-Manmad rail route. It is 8 km from taluka headquarter Manwath.

Trains 

Some of the trains that runs from Manwath Road are:

 Sainagar Shirdi–Vijayawada Express
 Aurangabad–H.S. Nanded Weekly Express
 Sainagar Shirdi–Secunderabad Express
 Ajanta Express
 Kakinada Port–Sainagar Shirdi Express
 Dharmabad–Manmad (Marathwada) Composite Express
 Hazur Sahib Nanded–Aurangabad Weekly Express
 Nandigram Express
 Tapovan Express
 Renigunta–Aurangabad Weekly Express
 Devagiri Express

References 

Railway stations in Parbhani district
Nanded railway division